Helcogramma alkamr is a species of triplefin blenny in the genus Helcogramma. It was described by Wouter Holleman in 2007. This species is found in the western Indian Ocean from the Comoros to the Seychelles, Mauritius and St Brandon. The specific name is derived for the Arabic name for Madagascar, where this species occurs, Jazirat al-Qumr.

References

alkamr
Taxa named by Wouter Holleman
Fish described in 2007